Filip Anthuenis (born 1965) is a Belgian politician and a member of the Open Flemish Liberals and Democrats. He was elected as a member of the Belgian Senate in 2007.

Filip Anthuenis graduated in Information Technology at the Industriële Hogeschool in Ghent. From 1995 until 2007, he was a member of the Belgian Chamber of Representatives. Since 2001, he is also the mayor of Lokeren.

Honours 
 2003: Knight in the Order of Leopold.
 2014: Officer of the Order of Leopold.

Notes

Living people
Open Vlaamse Liberalen en Democraten politicians
Members of the Belgian Federal Parliament
1965 births
21st-century Belgian politicians
Mayors of places in Belgium
People from Lokeren